Albert Ludwig "Ollie" Marquardt (September 22, 1902 – February 7, 1968) was a second baseman in Major League Baseball who played briefly for the Boston Red Sox during the 1931 season. He was born in Toledo, Ohio.

Marquardt appeared in 17 games for the hapless 1931 Red Sox as a 28-year-old rookie. He was just one of nine second basemen tried by manager Shano Collins, in a team that finished 6th in American League with a 59–93 record. In 15 fielding appearances, Marquardt played at second base (13), shortstop (1) and third, compiling a collective .947 fielding percentage. He was a .179 hitter (7-for-39) with one double, two RBI and four runs without home runs. He later became a successful minor league manager, posting a 293–189 record for the Class-B Cedar Rapids Raiders of the Three-I League from 1939 through 1942 –including three consecutive championship titles (1940–42)–, and leading the 1944 Toledo Mud Hens to a 95–58 finish in the American Association.

Marquardt died in Port Clinton, Ohio at age 65.

See also
1931 Boston Red Sox season

External links

Retrosheet

Boston Red Sox players
Major League Baseball infielders
Baseball players from Ohio
Sportspeople from Toledo, Ohio
Toledo Mud Hens managers
1902 births
1968 deaths
Nashville Vols players